Paul Wolfgang Panzerbeiter (November 3, 1872 – August 16, 1958), known professionally as Paul Panzer, was a German-American silent film actor.  He appeared in more than 330 films between 1905 and 1952.

Biography
Panzer was born in Würzburg.Bavaria. His education included studying pharmacy at the University of Wurzburg and studying vocal music at the Conservatory of Wurzburg. He was a lieutenant in German's artillery reserves when he left there. 

Panzer's early work building sets and painting scenes for a New York City film studio developed his interest in the film industry. He also was involved with live theater, working for Augustin Daly both on stage and as stage manager.

Panzer was best known for playing Koerner / Raymond Owen in The Perils of Pauline. From 1934 through the 1950s he was under contract to Warner Brothers as an extra.

Personal life

Panzer and his wife, Josephine, had a son and a daughter. After he retired from acting, Panzer lived with his daughter in Culver City, California. He died on August 16, 1949, in Hollywood, California, and was buried in Forest Lawn Cemetery in Hollywood Hills.

Selected filmography

 The Thieving Hand (1908, Short) – Man Buying Artificial Limb (uncredited)
 Macbeth (1908, Short) – Macduff
 Romeo and Juliet (1908, Short) – Romeo
 Princess Nicotine; or, The Smoke Fairy (1909, Short) – The Smoker
 The Perils of Pauline (1914, Serial) – Raymond Owen – aka Koerner (re-release)
 The Last Volunteer (1914) – Ambassador of Austrania
 The Exploits of Elaine (1914) – Minor Role
 Under Southern Skies (1915) – Steve Daubeney
 The Spender (1915) – Jim Walsh
 Autumn (1916) – Diamond Jack
 Elusive Isabel (1916) – Coount Rosini
 Broken Fetters (1916) – Carleton Demarest
 The House of Hate (1918)
 The Unchastened Woman (1918)
 The Woman the Germans Shot (1918)
 The Masked Rider (1919)
 Who's Your Brother? (1919)
 The Mystery Mind (1920)
 The Bootleggers (1922)
 The Mohican's Daughter (1922)
 Mighty Lak' a Rose (1923)
 Enemies of Women (1923)
 Jacqueline (1923)
 Unseeing Eyes (1923)
 A Son of the Sahara (1924)
 Wages of Virtue (1924)
 The Mad Marriage (1925)
 The Shock Punch (1925)
 Greater Than a Crown (1925)
 The Fool (1925)
 The Ancient Mariner (1925)
 Thunder Mountain (1925)
 The Best Bad Man (1925)
 Black Paradise (1926)
 The High Flyer (1926)
 The Johnstown Flood (1926)
 Siberia (1926)
 The Dixie Merchant (1926)
 Hawk of the Hills (1927)
 Sally in Our Alley (1927)
 The Girl from Chicago (1927)
 Rinty of the Desert (1928)
George Washington Cohen (1928)
 The Candy Kid (1928)
 The City of Purple Dreams (1928)
 Glorious Betsy (1928)
 The Black Book (1929)
 Dishonored (1931)
 Sea Devils (1931)
 Defenders of the Law (1931)
 Police Court (1932)
 The Kid from Spain (1932)
 The Song of Songs (1933)
 Times Square Playboy (1936)
 Bengal Tiger (1936)
 Highway West (1941)
 Casablanca (1942) – Rick's Waiter (uncredited)
 The Perils of Pauline (1947)

References

External links

 

1872 births
1958 deaths
20th-century German male actors
Actors from Würzburg
German emigrants to the United States
German male film actors
German male silent film actors
People from the Kingdom of Bavaria
Warner Bros. contract players